The 1978 NCAA Division I Men's Soccer Tournament was the 20th organized men's college soccer tournament by the National Collegiate Athletic Association, to determine the top college soccer team in the United States. The San Francisco Dons won their fourth national title, although it was later revoked by the NCAA, by defeating the Indiana Hoosiers in the championship game, 2–0. The final match was played on December 10, 1978, in Tampa, Florida, at Tampa Stadium for the first time.

Tournament field
S  - South region
NY - New York region
NE - New England region
MA - Mid-Atlantic region
MW - Mid-West region
FW - Far-West region
seeds

Championship Rounds

Third-Place Final

Final 

Championship was later vacated by the NCAA.

See also  
 1978 NCAA Division II Soccer Championship
 1978 NCAA Division III Soccer Championship
 1978 NAIA Soccer Championship

References 

Champ
NCAA Division I Men's Soccer Tournament seasons
NCAA Division I men's
Sports competitions in Tampa, Florida
NCAA Division I Men's Soccer
NCAA Division I Men's Soccer Tournament
Soccer in Florida